Professor Alexander William Bickerton (7 January 1842 – 21 January 1929) was the first professor of chemistry at Canterbury College (now called the University of Canterbury) in Christchurch, New Zealand. He is best known for teaching and mentoring Ernest Rutherford. He was a natural teacher though an eccentric one, who taught science in an exciting way. His differences were not limited to teaching as he formed a socialist community in Christchurch, which he later set up as a theme park. His partial impact theory explaining the appearance of temporary stars was the major work of his lifetime.

Early life

Alexander William Bickerton, was born on 7 January 1842, at Alton in Hampshire, England, the second son of Richard Bickerton, a builder's clerk, and Sophia Eames. His parents had both died before he left school. After not excelling at grammar school his uncle found him work in a railway workshop and later he worked in an engineering office. With inheritance money he set up a wood-working factory using machines that he had invented, but by 1864 the factory was in debt.

Teaching in England

Around this time Bickerton started attending science classes held in the area. His teacher Moses Pullen realised Bickerton had a natural talent for the subject and suggested he take up teaching science. By 1866 Bickerton was teaching science in Birmingham, while he was there he sat examinations for the Royal Exhibition for the School of Mines where he gained honours. In 1867 he moved to London where he was taught by prominent scientists of the time Edward Frankland, John Tyndall and Thomas Huxley. These influences increased Bickerton's passion to teach, but London was not as receptive to science teaching as Birmingham had been, and Bickerton's first class attracted just one person. To attract more students he looked at how successful preachers drew in large numbers. From his observations he said: "to instruct the Londoner you must make your class as entertaining as a music-hall and as sensational as a circus." This would characterise his teaching throughout his career. Before long his classes became very popular, and by 1869 he was teaching hundreds of students. In 1870 he took up a job offer to organise science work at the Hartley Institute, a position he held for three years until he became unhappy with conditions and sought other work.

Life in New Zealand

It was in 1873 that Canterbury College (now known as the University of Canterbury) was established in New Zealand. It was here Bickerton taught Ernest Rutherford where the two became lifelong friends and Bickerton became a mentor to Rutherford. Bickerton was offered the position of Chair of Chemistry and after acceptance he arrived with his wife and four children in Christchurch, New Zealand in June 1874. His new job was made harder without any lecture rooms, and few students due to science not being taught at secondary schools at the time. To increase interest he held night classes for adults, and basic chemistry classes for school children. Like London his reputation grew and he became known as a brilliant teacher.

In 1878 he formed his Partial Impact theory that he would try and prove for the rest of his life. The theory explains the appearance of bright new stars appearing in the sky due to two dark bodies colliding in space and forming a temporary bright third star as they move past each other. Locally it was thought to be a major astronomic breakthrough, though it failed to gain international support. Bickerton himself believed that the idea would eventually get acceptance from the scientific community, and pursued the theory throughout his life. Towards the end of the 19th century he was blamed for digressing into his own theory too often in class, and this was used as a reason by the Board of Governors to try to remove him from his position. Bickerton was often at odds with the Board due to his different teaching style, socialist views, and disrespect towards the church. In 1894 the Board launched an enquiry into how his department was run, but thanks to influential friends Bickerton kept his job. Unfortunately for him in 1902 the Board of Governors finally removed him from his job, Bickerton's social, political and religious views proved too different from those of the Board.

In September 1877, Bickerton stood for election to Christchurch City Council and was successful. Together with four other councillors, he resigned a year later in protest over the election of former mayor and convicted fraudster William Wilson.

Wainoni home
In 1884, Bickerton and his family moved into a new home near New Brighton, Christchurch that he named Wainoni. It became a centre for the social life of students at the Canterbury College. The property included a small theatre, a vast garden, and fireworks displays for entertainment. Bickerton's idea for the property was to create a new form of society based around his socialist beliefs, however this social experiment was discontinued after several years. From 1903 the property was turned more into a theme park to provide family income, with a zoo, 7,000 person amphitheatre, conservatory, aquariums, cinema, medicine and fireworks factories, and mock naval battles on a man-made lake – it attracted hundreds of thousands of people over the coming years. In the end the Pleasure Gardens as they were called started running at a loss and was closed by 1914.

Hope for theory recognition

In 1910 after significant developments in the astronomic field Bickerton believed he had another chance to get his Partial impact theory recognised. He went to London the same year, leaving his wife and five sons and two daughters in charge of the Wainoni home. Bickerton hoped he could get support from his most famous student Ernest Rutherford who commented on the theory: “the only satisfactory theory of accounting for the remarkable phenomena observed at the time of the appearance of a new star”. Rutherford wasn't an astronomer though, and he failed to sway opinion. Bickerton wasn't able to provide new evidence to explain his theory, and could only repeat what he previously thought. The theory did achieve some recognition by being included in authoritative writings as a possible explanation in the appearance of novae. Some years later Rutherford showed in experiments that third bodies would be produced by atomic impacts resulting in disintegration of one of the atoms.

Later life

His wife having died in 1919, Bickerton, aged 79 Bickerton was married again to Mary Wilkinson in 1920. He wrote a number of books during his life including: The Romance of the Heavens, The Romance of the Earth, and The Perils of a Pioneer. Sometimes close to destitution he never lost hope that his theory would one day be recognised. He died on 21 January 1929 holding the title of Professor Emeritus of Canterbury College.

Legacy

The suburb Wainoni is now an eastern suburb in Christchurch, New Zealand – taken from the name of Bickerton's home translated from Māori meaning "the bend in the water"
Bickerton St in Christchurch was named after him, and is in the location of the original Wainoni Home
An asteroid found in 1989 is named after him: 4837 Bickerton

References

1842 births
Experimental physicists
New Zealand chemists
New Zealand physicists
Alumni of Imperial College London
Academic staff of the University of Canterbury
British chemists
People from Alton, Hampshire
1929 deaths
Christchurch City Councillors